Maharepa is a village on the island of Mo'orea, in French Polynesia.

Populated places in the Society Islands
Mo'orea